Gabriel Barès (born 29 August 2000) is a Swiss professional footballer who plays as a midfielder for Swiss Challenge League club Thun, on loan from  club Montpellier.

Club career
Barès made his professional debut with Lausanne-Sport in a 2–1 Swiss Super League win over Servette on 9 September 2020.

On 25 January 2022, Barès joined Montpellier in France. On 27 July 2022, he returned to Switzerland and joined Thun on loan.

References

External links
 
 SFL Profile

2000 births
Living people
Sportspeople from Lausanne
Swiss men's footballers
Association football midfielders
Switzerland youth international footballers
Switzerland under-21 international footballers
FC Lausanne-Sport players
Montpellier HSC players
FC Thun players
Swiss Challenge League players
Swiss Super League players
Championnat National 2 players
Swiss expatriate footballers
Expatriate footballers in France
Swiss expatriate sportspeople in France